Polaris SnoCross is a snocross snowmobile racing game for Game Boy Color, PlayStation, Nintendo 64, and later Microsoft Windows. It was released in 2000. French publisher Wanadoo Edition released a budget version of the game for the PC in 2001, called SnowCross.

Reception

The PlayStation version received "mixed" reviews according to the review aggregation website Metacritic.

References

External links
 
 

2000 video games
Cancelled Dreamcast games
Game Boy Color games
Nintendo 64 games
PlayStation (console) games
Off-road racing video games
Video games developed in the United States
Windows games
Vatical Entertainment games
Vicarious Visions games
Multiplayer and single-player video games